Blue Cave may refer to:

 Blue Cave (album), an album by Australian rock group Hoodoo Gurus
 Blue Cave (Kastellorizo), an attraction on the Greek island of Kastelorizo

See also
 Blue Grotto (disambiguation)